Pidhaitsi Raion was a raion in the western part of Ternopil Oblast, western Ukraine. It was part of the historic area known as Halychyna (Galicia). The administrative center was the city of Pidhaitsi. The Koropets river flowed through the district. This raion was formed as a separate district on December 6, 1991 by a decree of the Ukrainian parliament. Before that it was part of neighbouring Berezhany Raion. The raion was abolished on 18 July 2020 as part of the administrative reform of Ukraine, which reduced the number of raions of Ternopil Oblast to three. The area of Pidhaitsi Raion was merged into Ternopil Raion. The last estimate of the raion population was

Subdivisions
At the time of disestablishment, the raion consisted of one hromada,
Pidhaitsi urban hromada with the administration in Pidhaitsi.

Population

The population of the district was 22,913 inhabitants. Of these 3,203 are concentrated in Pidhaitsi, the rest in the villages cited below.

Territory

Villages

Names are presented in modern Ukrainian transliteration. Polish spellings (often used in documents prior to 1939 when the area was part of the Austro-Hungarian empire and Poland) are given in parenthesis:

Bilokrynytsia (Białokrynica)
Bokiv (Boków)
Bronhalivka (Brongalówka)
Сherven
Vaha (Waga)
Verbiv (Wierzbów)
Volytsia (Wolica)
Halych (Halicz) - should not be mistaken with the city of Halych, in Ivano-Frankivsk Oblast
Hnylche (Hnylcze)
Holhocha (Hołhocze)
Holendra (Holendry)
Zavaliv (Zawałów) - used to be a town and is one of the more interesting larger villages in the district.
Zahaitsi (Zahajce)
Zastavche (Zastawcze)
Zaturyn (Zaturyn)
Lysa (Łysa)
Lytvyniv (Litwinów)
Myrne - former name: Telache (Telacze)
Mykhailivka (Michałówka)
Mozolivka (Mozołówka)
Myzhyliv (Mużyłów)
Novosilka (Nowosiółka)
Nosiv (Nosów)
Panovychi (Panowice)
Poplavy (Popławy)
Rudnyky (Rudniki)
Serednye (Seredne)
Siltse (Siołko)
Soniachne (Soniachne)
Stare Misto (Stare Miasto)
Staryi Lytvyniv (Stary Litwinów)
Stepove (Stepowe)
Uhryniv (Uhrynów)
Shumliany (Szumliany)
Yustynivka (Justynówka)
Yablunivka (Jabłonówka)

References

External links
  Website about Pidhaytsi
  Photos of Pidhaytsi (70 digital images from 2004)
  Nature at Pidhaytsi - Photos
  Pidhaytsi Jewish history
  American Jewish couple visits Pidhaytsi (2001)
  Pidhaytsi Jewish history - article in word
  Pidhaitsi info, history and photos

Former raions of Ternopil Oblast
1991 establishments in Ukraine
Ukrainian raions abolished during the 2020 administrative reform